Viktor Okishev (born 4 February 1994 in Petropavl) is a Kazakh cyclist, who is currently suspended from the sport.

He was suspended for 2 years in 2014 when he tested positive for anabolic steroids, and was suspended for 8 years in 2018, following a second positive test for erythropoietin (EPO).

Major results
2013
 4th Time trial, National Road Championships
2014
1st Time trial, Asian Under-23 Road Championships

References

External links

1994 births
Living people
Kazakhstani male cyclists
People from Petropavl